Kuzemkino is a rural locality (a village) in Pyatovskoye Rural Settlement, Totemsky District, Vologda Oblast, Russia. The population was 3 as of 2002.

Geography 
Kuzemkino is located 16 km northeast of Totma (the district's administrative centre) by road. Fedotovo is the nearest rural locality.

References 

Rural localities in Totemsky District